Eduardo De Jesus Rodriguez MD, DDS (born October 13, 1966, in Miami, Florida) is a Cuban American plastic and reconstructive surgeon, and reconstructive transplant surgeon, who is known for his contribution to the field of facial transplantation and vascularized composite allotransplantation. Rodriguez practiced in Baltimore until 2013 when he was appointed the Helen L. Kimmel Professor of Reconstructive Plastic Surgery and Chair of the Hansjörg Wyss Department of Plastic Surgery at NYU Langone Health, where he serves as the director of the Face Transplant Program. Most recently, he led the team that performed the first simultaneous face and double hand transplantation, on August 12, 2020, on recipient Joe Dimeo, a 22-year-old man who suffered full-thickness burns to over 80% of his body after a high-speed car accident in 2018.

Early life and education 
Rodriguez was raised in Miami, FL, in a family of Cuban immigrants. He attended Belen Jesuit Preparatory School, graduating in 1984. He went on to earn his Bachelor of Science in Neurobiology in 1988 from the University of Florida in Gainesville, FL. He initially pursued a career in dentistry, earning a DDS from New York University College of Dentistry in 1992. He then completed residency training in oral and maxillofacial surgery at Montefiore Medical Center/Albert Einstein College of Medicine in the Bronx, NY, in 1997. During residency training, the program director at Jacobi Medical Center suggested Rodriguez pursue medical training. Rodriguez went on to receive his medical degree from Virginia Commonwealth University, Richmond, VA, in 1999. After that, he was accepted into the combined plastic surgery residency program at Johns Hopkins Hospital/University of Maryland Medical Center. Rodriguez went on to complete an International Reconstructive Microsurgery Fellowship at Chang Gung Memorial Hospital in Taipei, Taiwan, in 2004.

Career and facial transplantation 
Rodriguez was introduced to the concept of facial transplantation at a medical conference during his final year of training, where Dr. Maria Siemionow, a polish transplant surgeon and scientist, presented her experience transplanting the faces of brown rats to white rats. After completing a fellowship in Taiwan, Rodriguez returned to Baltimore, where he conducted large animal studies funded by a grant from the Office of Naval Research before proceeding with clinical trials in humans.

University of Maryland School of Medicine and R. Adams Cowley Shock Trauma Center 
After completing his postgraduate training, Rodriguez returned to Baltimore, MD. Intending to help wounded soldiers, the United States Department of Defense expressed interest in funding studies in facial transplantation. Rodriguez used a large animal model to establish a proof of concept for facial transplantation as part of an Office of Naval Research Grant that aimed to provide technical support for clinical trials in humans.

In March 2012, he led a team of approximately 150 medical experts to perform what was called the "most extensive face transplant" at the time, a procedure that required 36 hours in the operating room. The recipient was 37-year-old Richard Norris, who had suffered a facial gunshot injury in 1997. The transplant included the skin of the donor’s entire face and anterior neck, the upper and lower jaws, teeth, and tongue. In 2013, Rodriguez was named the inaugural Paul N. Manson, MD Distinguished Professor in Plastic and Reconstructive Surgery.

NYU Langone Health 
In 2013, Rodriguez began work at NYU Langone Health as the Chair of the Hansjörg Wyss Department of Plastic Surgery. On August 15, 2015, Rodriguez led a surgical team of more than 100 medical professionals to perform an extensive face transplant in a 41-year-old retired firefighter Patrick Hardison. The patient received the face of David Rodebaugh, who passed away after a tragic cycling accident.

On January 5, 2018, Rodriguez again led a surgical team from NYU Langone Health to perform the institution’s second face transplant. The recipient was 24-year-old Cameron Underwood of Yuba City, California, who suffered a self-inflicted facial gunshot wound in June 2016. As a result of the initial injury and despite several attempts at conventional reconstruction, Underwood still missed most of his lower jaw, all but one tooth, and his nose. He also suffered damage to the maxillary region (upper face) and palate, severely impairing his ability to eat, speak, and lead a normal life. The surgery took approximately 25 hours and involved the transfer of the donor’s facial skin below the eyes, the entire nose, both jaws, and teeth.

On August 12, 2020, Rodriguez led a team of over 140 personnel in successfully transplanting the face and both hands of a brain-dead donor onto 22-year-old Joseph Dimeo. In June 2018, Dimeo suffered full-thickness burns to over 80% of his body after a high-speed car accident, leaving him severely disfigured and incapable of independently performing many basic activities of daily living. The transplant procedure lasted approximately 23 hours and involved the replacement of the entire facial soft tissue (extending from the anterior hairline to the neck, including the eyelids, nose, lips, and ears, along with strategic skeletal components), as well as both hands at the distal forearm level.

Awards 
In 2018, Rodriguez was awarded the Ellis Island Medal of Honor which recognizes individuals with ethnic heritage that promoted significant contributions to American society. The Maryland Hispanic Chamber of Commerce and the Education Based Latino Outreach established “The Dr. Eduardo Rodriguez Science & Robotics Academy” in his honor.

Bibliography 
Rodriguez has authored over 250 scientific publications.

Personal life and family 
Rodriguez has been married to Ana Maria Rodriguez for 25 years, and they live in New York City.

References 

People from Miami
New York University College of Dentistry alumni
American people of Cuban descent
American plastic surgeons
Virginia Commonwealth University alumni
University of Florida alumni
New York University faculty
1966 births
Living people
Physicians from Florida